Francis Coffie (born September 20, 1989, in Accra) is a Ghanaian international footballer.

Career 
Coffie began his career for Power F.C. and joined in August 2007 to Asante Kotoko. In July 2010, he began his career for CD Leganés.

International career 
He was called up for the Black Stars for a friendly game against Argentina national football team and marked in the game on 1 October 2009 his debut.

References

External links

1989 births
Living people
Ghanaian footballers
Association football midfielders
Asante Kotoko S.C. players
Ghana international footballers
Power F.C. players
CD Leganés players
Medeama SC players
Ashanti Gold SC players
Al-Watani Club players
Ghanaian expatriate footballers
Expatriate footballers in Spain
Saudi First Division League players
Ghana A' international footballers
2009 African Nations Championship players
Ghanaian expatriate sportspeople in Sudan
Ghanaian expatriate sportspeople in Saudi Arabia
Ghanaian expatriate sportspeople in Spain
Expatriate footballers in Sudan
Expatriate footballers in Saudi Arabia